Brăești may refer to several places in Romania:

 Brăești, Botoșani, a commune in Botoșani County
 Brăești, Iași, a commune in Iași County
 Brăești, Buzău, a commune in Buzău County